Camarès is a commune in the Aveyron department in southern France.

Geography
Situated 23 kilometres south of Saint-Affrique and 80 kilometres from Béziers, the commune is  traversed by the Dourdou de Camarès and sits at the foot of the Monts de Lacaune.

Its red soil, le rougier, is a schistose sandstone. It covers a rich substrate which was exploited for the first mines of copper and argentiferous lead during the Gallo-Roman era.

The commune includes a thermal basin with springs that are no longer in use today:  Prugnes les eaux, Andabre, Le Cayla et Sylvanès (eau thermale).

Population

See also
Communes of the Aveyron department
List of medieval bridges in France

References

Communes of Aveyron
Aveyron communes articles needing translation from French Wikipedia